

Surname 
Fleishhacker is an American surname of German origin. Notable people with the surname include:
 Aaron Fleishhacker (1820–1989), German-born American businessman
 Herbert Fleishhacker (1872–1957),  American businessman, civic leader and philanthropist

Places 
Mortimer Fleishhacker House in Woodside, California
Fleishhacker Pool in San Francisco, California
San Francisco Zoo, originally known as Fleishhacker Zoo

See also
 Fleischhacker

English-language surnames